Pınarbaşı Gölü is an archaeological site in Turkey containing objects from the Epipaleolithic period. It is located in Konya Province, Central Anatolia.

Spearheads have been found here as well as blanks for a hooked tang dagger and flat axes. The objects are not securely datable.

References

Archaeological sites of prehistoric Anatolia
Epipalaeolithic